A Mortal Flower is an autobiography by Han Suyin.  It covers the years 1928 to 1938: her growing up in China and her journey to Belgium and her mother's family.  Also her marriage to a rising officer in the Kuomintang and the retreat to Chungking in the face of the Japanese invasion of China.

References

1966 non-fiction books
Autobiographies
Books about China
Books by Han Suyin
Jonathan Cape books